Wong Yung-kan, SBS, JP (10 August 1951) is a former member of the Legislative Council of Hong Kong, representing Agriculture and Fisheries functional constituency.

Born into a Tanka family, he is a fisherman. He was a member of the pro-Beijing Democratic Alliance for the Betterment and Progress of Hong Kong (DAB), until he quit the party in 2016 and planned to run for the 2016 Legislative Council of Hong Kong. He is also a former member of Tai Po District Council representing Po Nga constituency.

References

1951 births
Living people
Chinese fishers
District councillors of Tai Po District
Hong Kong Buddhists
Democratic Alliance for the Betterment and Progress of Hong Kong politicians
HK LegCo Members 1998–2000
HK LegCo Members 2000–2004
HK LegCo Members 2004–2008
HK LegCo Members 2008–2012
Recipients of the Silver Bauhinia Star